Alfredo Catalani (19 June 1854 – 7 August 1893) was an Italian operatic composer. He is best remembered for his operas Loreley (1890) and La Wally (1892). La Wally was composed to a libretto by Luigi Illica, and features Catalani's most famous aria "Ebben? Ne andrò lontana." This aria, sung by American soprano Wilhelmenia Fernandez, was at the heart of Jean-Jacques Beineix's 1981 film Diva. Catalani's other operas were much less successful.

Life and career

Born in Lucca, Catalani came from a musical family. He was trained at the Milan Conservatory, where his teachers included Antonio Bazzini. Despite the growing influence of the verismo style of opera during the 1880s and early 1890s, Catalani chose to compose in a more traditional manner, which had traces of Wagner in it. As a result, his operas (La Wally excepted) have largely lost their place in the modern repertoire, even compared to those of Massenet and Puccini, whose style his own periodically resembles. (Catalani much resented Puccini's emergence and even accused Puccini, falsely, of plagiarism.)

The influence of Amilcare Ponchielli can also be recognized in Catalani's output. Catalani's reputation, like Ponchielli's, now rests almost entirely on one work. However, while La Wally enjoys occasional revivals, Ponchielli's La Gioconda has always been the more popular opera of the two (287 performances, most recently in 2008 at the Metropolitan Opera, New York, as opposed to only four for La Wally, not produced there since 1909).

In 1893, upon his premature death from tuberculosis in Milan, Catalani was interred in the Cimitero Monumentale, where Ponchielli and conductor Arturo Toscanini also lie. A passionate admirer of Catalani's music, Toscanini even named one of his daughters Wally. Toscanini recorded the prelude to Act IV of La Wally and the "Dance of the Water Nymphs" from Loreley in Carnegie Hall in August 1952 with the NBC Symphony Orchestra for RCA Victor.

Almost 90 years after his death, in 1981, his work was highlighted by the release of Diva, a thriller directed by Jean-Jacques Beineix which employed the aria from La Wally.

Operas
La falce ("The Sickle"), Milan, 19 July 1875
Elda, Turin, 31 January 1880 (radically revised as Loreley)
Dejanice, Milan, 17 March 1883
Edmea, Milan, 27 February 1886
Loreley, Turin, 16 February 1890
La Wally, Milan, 20 January 1892

Symphonic works
Sinfonia a piena orchestra ("Symphony for Full Orchestra"), 1872 
Il Mattino, sinfonia romantica ("Morning", Romantic symphony), 1874
Ero e Leandro, poema sinfonico ("Hero and Leander", Symphonic tone poem), Milan, 9 May 1885

References

Further reading
 Berrong, Richard M. (editor and translator). The Politics of Opera in Turn-Of-The-Century Italy: As Seen Through the Letters of Alfredo Catalani. 1992. (Studies in the History and Interpretation of Music)
 Pardini, Domenico Luigi, Relton, Valentina (translator), Chandler, David (editor), Alfredo Catalani: Composer of Lucca, 2010.
 Paolo Petronio, Alfredo Catalani, (in Italian language), coll. "Personaggi della Musica" 14, pagine VII+536, ill., Zecchini Editore, Varese, 2014.

External links
Opera Italiana Detailed biography

Paolo Petronio, Alfredo Catalani, musical biography, Ed.Italo Svevo, Trieste,2009

1854 births
1893 deaths
19th-century classical composers
19th-century deaths from tuberculosis
19th-century Italian male musicians
Burials at the Cimitero Monumentale di Milano
Italian classical composers
Italian male classical composers
Italian opera composers
Italian Romantic composers
Male opera composers
Milan Conservatory alumni
Academic staff of Milan Conservatory
Musicians from Lucca
Tuberculosis deaths in Italy
Infectious disease deaths in Lombardy